Jabbeke is a municipality located in the Belgian province of West Flanders. The municipality comprises the towns of Jabbeke proper, Snellegem, Stalhille, Varsenare and Zerkegem. On 1 January 2006 the municipality had 13,572 inhabitants.

Speed records
In the 1940s and 1950s it was renowned for the number of speed records set on a measured kilometer of highway. Not just absolute speed records, manufacturers wanted each model's maximum speed measured and certified by the Royal Automobile Club of Belgium.

Famous inhabitants
 Constant Permeke (°1886 - 1952) was a Belgian painter who is considered the leading figure of Flemish expressionism, born in Antwerp.
 Steve Ramon (°1979), won two Motocross world championships between 1996 and 2011, born in Zerkegem.
 Romain Maes (°1912 - 1983), winner of the Tour de France in 1935, was born in Zerkegem.
 Hugo Broos (°1952), Belgian footballer and coach.
 Stijn De Smet (°1985), Belgian footballer for Cercle Brugge K.S.V., K.A.A. Gent and K.V. Kortrijk.

References

External links

 
Municipalities of West Flanders